Fight for Freedom may refer to:

 "Fight for Freedom", a 1941 song by Harold Levey.
 Fight For Freedom, FFF, a gang from the San Fernando Valley, California, US
 The Fight for Freedom, a 1908 film by D.W. Griffith
 Gladiator: Fight for Freedom, the first novel in the Gladiator book series by Simon Scarrow
 Hidden & Dangerous: Fight for Freedom, an expansion for the Hidden & Dangerous video game.
 Fighting for Freedom, 2013 American drama film written by Chris Loken and directed by Farhad Mann. Starring Kristanna Loken, Bruce Dern, José María Yazpik and Patricia De León.
 Fighting for Freedom: The Ukrainian Volunteer Division of the Waffen-SS, a book by Richard Landwehr
 Churchill and Orwell: The Fight for Freedom, book by Thomas E. Ricks
 "Fight for Freedom", an episode of the anime television series Yu-Gi-Oh! Arc-V

See also
 Bach's Fight for Freedom, a 1995 film 
 Mandela's Fight for Freedom, known as Death of Apartheid, a three-part documentary series by BBC
 Winter on Fire: Ukraine's Fight for Freedom, a 2015 documentary film
 Freedom on Fire: Ukraine's Fight for Freedom, a 2023 documentary film

 DGUSA Freedom Fight, a pay-per-view professional wrestling event
 Freedom Fighters (disambiguation)
 Flight for Freedom, a 1943 film starring Rosalind Russell and Fred MacMurray about Amelia Earhart